The Department of Home Affairs is the Australian Government interior ministry with responsibilities for national security, law enforcement, emergency management, border control, immigration, refugees, citizenship, transport security and multicultural affairs. The portfolio also includes federal agencies such as the Australian Federal Police, Australian Border Force and the Australian Security Intelligence Organisation. The Home Affairs portfolio reports to the Minister for Home Affairs, currently held by Clare O'Neil, and is led by the Secretary of the Department of Home Affairs, Mike Pezzullo. In 2022, the Australian Federal Police, Australian Criminal Intelligence Commission and Australian Transaction and Analysis Center were de-merged from the department and moved to the Attorney General portfolio.

The Department was officially established on 20 December 2017, building on the former Department of Immigration and Border Protection and bringing policy responsibilities and agencies from the Attorney-General's Department, Department of Infrastructure and Regional Development, Department of the Prime Minister and Cabinet, and Department of Social Services. The Department of Home Affairs is seen as the Australian version of the United Kingdom's Home Office or the United States Department of Homeland Security.

History

One of the seven inaugural Australian Public Service departments at the federation of Australia was the Department of Home Affairs (1901–16) with wide-ranging responsibilities for public works, elections, census, the public service, pensions, and inter-state relations. This department was followed by the Department of Home and Territories (1916–1928), the Department of Home Affairs (1928–32), the Department of the Interior (1932–39), the Department of the Interior (1939–72), the Department of Home Affairs (1977–80), and the Department of Home Affairs and Environment (1980–84). Prior to the formation of the current Department of Home Affairs, the Attorney-General's Department had responsibility for national security, law enforcement, emergency management as well as border protection alongside the various forms of the Department of Immigration and Citizenship.

The proposed establishment of the Department of Home Affairs was announced by Prime Minister Malcolm Turnbull on 18 July 2017 to be headed by Immigration Minister Peter Dutton as the designated Minister for Home Affairs to bring together all national security, border control and law enforcement agencies of the government. The Department was officially stood up on the 20 December 2017 through an Administrative Arrangements Order.

The Department combines the national security, law enforcement and emergency management functions of the Attorney-General's Department, the transport security functions of the Department of Infrastructure and Regional Development, the counterterrorism and cybersecurity functions of the Department of the Prime Minister and Cabinet, the multicultural affairs functions of the Department of Social Services, and the entirety of the Department of Immigration and Border Protection.

Ministers
The ministers of the Home Affairs portfolio were announced on 31 May 2022 by the newly elected Prime Minister Anthony Albanese including a Minister for Immigration, Citizenship and Multicultural Affairs held by Andrew Giles and a Minister for Emergency Management held by Murray Watt.

The following are the ministers of the portfolio:
Minister for Home Affairs: Clare O'Neil
Minister for Immigration, Citizenship and Multicultural Affairs: Andrew Giles
Minister for Emergency Management: Murray Watt

Portfolio responsibilities
The Department is responsible for the following functions:

National security policy and operations, including 
Countering terrorism policy and coordination
Countering foreign interference
Countering violent extremism programs
Law enforcement policy and operations
Immigration and migration, including 
border security
entry, stay and departure arrangements for non-citizens
customs and border control other than quarantine and inspection
Multicultural affairs
Transport Security
Cyber policy coordination
Protective Services at Commonwealth establishments and diplomatic and consular premises in Australia
Critical infrastructure protection co-ordination
Commonwealth emergency management
Natural disaster relief, recovery and mitigation policy and financial assistance including payments to the States and Territories and the Australian Government Disaster Recovery Payment

Departmental functions

Counter-Terrorism 
The Commonwealth Counter-Terrorism Coordinator and the Centre for Counter-Terrorism Coordination within the Department of Home Affairs (formerly within the Department of the Prime Minister and Cabinet) provides strategic advice and support to the Minister for Home Affairs and the Prime Minister on all aspects of counterterrorism and countering violent extremism policy and co-ordination across government. The Office was created after recommendations from the Review of Australia's Counter-Terrorism Machinery in 2015 in response to the 2014 Sydney hostage crisis. The Commonwealth Counter-Terrorism Coordinator also serves as the Co-Chair and or Chair of the Australian and New Zealand Counter-Terrorism Committee and the Joint Counter-Terrorism Board, with the Centre for Counter-Terrorism Coordination providing secretariat support to the Australian Counter-Terrorism Centre and the Australian and New Zealand Counter-Terrorism Committee. Along with the Deputy Counter-Terrorism Coordinator, the Centre for Counter-Terrorism Coordination is also composed of the Counter-Terrorism Operational Coordination and Evaluation Branch, the Counter-Terrorism Strategic Coordination Branch, the Counter-Terrorism Capability Branch, and the Home Affairs Counter-Terrorism Policy Branch.

Cyber Security 
The National Cyber Security Adviser and the Cyber Security Policy Division within the Department of Home Affairs (formerly within the Department of the Prime Minister and Cabinet) are responsible for cyber security policy and the implementation of the Australian Government Cyber Security Strategy. The National Cyber Coordinator also ensures effective partnerships between Commonwealth, state and territory governments, the private sector, non-governmental organisations, the research community and international partners. The National Cyber Coordinator also works closely with the Australian Cyber Security Centre and the Australian Ambassador for Cyber Issues.

CERT Australia is the national computer emergency response team responsible for cybersecurity responses and providing cyber security advice and support to critical infrastructure and other systems of national interest. CERT Australia works closely with other Australian Government agencies, international CERTs, and the private sector. It is also a key element in the Australian Cyber Security Centre, sharing information and working closely with ASIO, the Australian Federal Police, the Australian Signals Directorate, the Defence Intelligence Organisation and the Australian Criminal Intelligence Commission.

Aviation and Maritime Security
The Aviation and Maritime Security Division (formerly the Office of Transport Security within the Department of Infrastructure and Regional Development) is led by the Executive Director of Transport Security and is responsible for aviation security, air cargo security, maritime security, and various transport security operations.

Transnational Serious and Organised Crime  
The Commonwealth Transnational Serious and Organised Crime Coordinator is responsible for policy development and strategic coordination of the disruption of transnational serious organised crime across the Australian Government including the Australian Federal Police, Australian Border Force, Australian Criminal Intelligence Commission, Australian Transaction Reports and Analysis Centre, and state and territory law enforcement agencies. The Coordinator is held concurrently by an Australian Federal Police Deputy Commissioner.

Counter Child Exploitation  
The Australian Centre to Counter Child Exploitation is a whole-of-government initiative within the Australian Federal Police responsible to the Commonwealth Transnational Serious and Organised Crime Coordinator to investigate, disrupt and prosecute child exploitation and online child abuse crimes.

Counter Foreign Interference 
The National Counter Foreign Interference Coordinator is responsible for policy development and strategic coordination of countering foreign interference and counter-espionage to protect the integrity of Australian national security and interests. The Coordinator is responsible for interagency and intergovernmental strategy and coordination to counter coercive, clandestine or deceptive activities undertaken on behalf of foreign powers. Accordingly, the Coordinator acts as an intergovernmental focal point for the Australian Federal Police, the Australian Security Intelligence Organisation, the Department of Foreign Affairs and Trade, the Attorney-General's Department, and elements of the Department of Defence such as the Defence Security and Vetting Service and Australian Defence Force Investigative Service.

Critical Infrastructure 
The Australian Government Critical Infrastructure Centre (CIC) is responsible for whole-of-government coordination of critical infrastructure protection and national security risk assessments and advice. It was established on 23 January 2017 originally within the Attorney-General's Department and brings together expertise and capability from across the Australian Government and functions in close consultation states and territory governments, regulators, and the private sector. The Centre also supports the Foreign Investment Review Board and brings together staff from across governmental authorities including from the Australian Treasury, the Department of Infrastructure and Regional Development, and the Department of the Environment and Energy.

Crisis Coordination 
The Australian Government Crisis Coordination Centre (CCC) is an all-hazards coordination facility, which operates on a 24/7 basis, and supports the Australian Government Crisis Committee (AGCC) and the National Crisis Committee (NCC). The CCC provides whole-of-government all-hazards monitoring and situational awareness for domestic and international events and coordinates Australian Government responses to major domestic incidents. The Crisis Coordination Centre is managed by the Crisis Management Branch of Emergency Management Australia which was within the Attorney-General's Department before its transfer.

Departmental Executive  
 Secretary of Home Affairs 
 Deputy Secretary (Executive) 
 Deputy Secretary (Policy) 
 Deputy Secretary (Corporate and Enabling) / Chief Operating Officer 
 Deputy Secretary (Intelligence and Capability)
 Deputy Secretary (Immigration and Citizenship Services) 
 Deputy Secretary (Infrastructure, Transport Security and Customs) / Deputy Comptroller-General of Customs 
 Commonwealth Counter-Terrorism Coordinator
 National Cyber Security Adviser
 Commonwealth Transnational Serious and Organised Crime Coordinator 
 National Counter Foreign Interference Coordinator
 Commissioner of the Australian Border Force / Comptroller-General of Customs 
 Director-General of Security 
 Chief Executive Officer of the Australian Criminal Intelligence Commission 
 Chief Executive Officer of the Australian Transaction Reports and Analysis Centre

Portfolio agencies
Australian Security Intelligence Organisation
Australian Criminal Intelligence Commission
Australian Transaction Reports and Analysis Centre
Australian Institute of Criminology
Australian Border Force (including the Maritime Border Command and Operation Sovereign Borders)

See also

 Department of Home Affairs (1901–16)
 Department of Home and Territories (1916–1928)
 Department of Home Affairs (1928–32)
 Department of the Interior (1932–39)
 Department of the Interior (1939–72)
 Department of Home Affairs (1977–80)
 Department of Home Affairs and Environment (1980–84)

References

2017 establishments in Australia
Government departments of Australia
Australian intelligence agencies
Lists of government agencies in Australia
Government agencies established in 2017
Law enforcement in Australia
Australian criminal law
Crime in Australia
Public policy in Australia
Federal law enforcement agencies of Australia
Terrorism in Australia
Australia